Zaoksky (masculine), Zaokskaya (feminine), or Zaokskoye (neuter) may refer to:
Zaoksky District, a district of Tula Oblast, Russia
Zaoksky (urban-type settlement), an urban locality (a work settlement) in Zaoksky District of Tula Oblast, Russia
Zaokskoye, a rural locality (a selo) in Ryazan Oblast, Russia

See also
Zaoksky Adventist University (Zaokskaya dukhovnaya akademiya), a private Christian university in Tula Oblast, Russia